Nimesh Kampani (born 30 September 1946) is an Indian investment banker. He is the chairman of the JM Financial group of companies. His personal wealth was valued at US$ 595 million in 2009 making him the 83rd richest in India, at that time. The Kampani family's combined direct and indirect equity ownership of JM Financial Ltd is between 60% and 65%. Livemint called him along with Hemendra Kothari and Uday Kotak the "Three K's" of India's leaders in investment banking.

In 2014, the court named him as the mediator in the inheritance dispute between Shardul and Cyril Shroff over the law firm Amarchand Mangaldas, which at the time was India's largest.

Early life and education
Kampani is a commerce graduate from Sydenham College of Commerce and Economics and is a Chartered Accountant.

Controversy 
Nimesh Kampani was reported hiding in 2009 to avoid an arrest in India for payment default by a Hyderabad company called Nagarjuna Finance of around 500 crores.

References

Indian billionaires
1946 births
Living people
Indian Jains